Sphingobacterium gobiense is a Gram-negative, short rod-shaped, non-spore-formin and non-motile bacterium from the genus of Sphingobacterium which has been isolated from soil from the Gobi Desert in the Xinjiang Province in China.

References

Sphingobacteriia
Gobi Desert
Bacteria described in 2014